Hypocacculus is a genus of clown beetles in the family Histeridae. There are more than 20 described species in Hypocacculus.

Species
These 22 species belong to the genus Hypocacculus:

 Hypocacculus atrocyaneus (Schmidt, 1888)
 Hypocacculus australis Vienna, 1993
 Hypocacculus biskrensis (Marseul, 1876)
 Hypocacculus caeruleoniger (Desbordes, 1917)
 Hypocacculus congocola Desbordes, 1924
 Hypocacculus curtus (Rosenhauer, 1847)
 Hypocacculus deuvei Gomy & Vienna, 1998
 Hypocacculus elongatulus (Rosenhauer, 1856)
 Hypocacculus gambiensis Dahlgren, 1981
 Hypocacculus harmonicus (Marseul, 1869)
 Hypocacculus hyla (Marseul, 1864)
 Hypocacculus infensus G.Müller, 1937
 Hypocacculus metallescens (Erichson, 1834)
 Hypocacculus praecox (Erichson, 1834)
 Hypocacculus pseudorubricatus Vienna, 1993
 Hypocacculus rubricatus (Lewis, 1899)
 Hypocacculus simillimus Vienna, 1993
 Hypocacculus simulans Vienna, 1993
 Hypocacculus simulator G.Müller, 1944
 Hypocacculus solieri (Marseul, 1862)
 Hypocacculus spretulus (Erichson, 1834)
 Hypocacculus virens Dahlgren, 1973

References

Further reading

 
 
 

Histeridae
Articles created by Qbugbot